Oregon Raceway Park is a 2.3-mile dedicated road course facility in Grass Valley, Oregon that hosts competitive automobile, kart and motorcycle events. It opened in November, 2008. Construction cost of the track was $3.2 million. The track has 16 turns, including one banked at 16 degrees. One lap covers 400 vertical feet.

References

External links 
Official site

Motorsport venues in Oregon
Buildings and structures in Sherman County, Oregon
Tourist attractions in Sherman County, Oregon
Sports venues completed in 2008
2008 establishments in Oregon